Hoangus venustus, commonly known as the flax ladybird, is a species of ladybird beetle that is native to New Zealand, being found at least in the North Island. It can be found on New Zealand flax (Phormium) and Toetoe (cutty grass), reportedly eating the mealybugs that live there. Previously known as Cassiculus venustus, the valid name of the species is now Hoangus venustus.

The species' colouration is black and orange: its head is orange on each side with black running down the middle, while its elytra or wing cases (which cover the back) are orange around the edge with black covering much of the area. It has four orange dots on this black area, two on each elytron. It is about 4 mm long from the tip of the head to the end of the abdomen (description based on a life-size photo in Andrew Crowe's Which New Zealand Insect).

See also

Coccinella leonina, another native ladybird

References

  2019: Redescription and notes on the New Zealand ladybird species Hoangus venustus (Pascoe, 1875) (Coleoptera Coccinellidae). Journal of Asia-Pacific Entomology, 22: 226–232.

Coccinellidae
Beetles of New Zealand
Endemic fauna of New Zealand
Beetles described in 1875
Taxa named by Francis Polkinghorne Pascoe
Endemic insects of New Zealand